The Rokua railway or Children's Land Railway ( or ), was a  long narrow gauge railway operating in the Rokua region in Utajärvi municipality in Finland.

The line was demolished by Utajärvi municipality in May 2022, when the price of scrap steel was high.

Route
The line connected the Hotel Rokuanhovi with the Rokua Fitness Centre, running through moraine and dune covered terrain. There were balloon loops at both ends of the line, and the passenger carriages had doors on only one side. There were no intermediate stations.

Rolling stock
The train was hauled by a DHL-15 diesel hydraulic locomotive equipped with 37.5-kilowatt Dent engine. The locomotive weighs around five tonnes. The two 24-seat passenger carriages were made by Tuomo Takalo ky of Nivala. After the closure and demolition, the locomotive and one coach was retained as a memorial.

References

External links
 Pictures from the Rokua railway, in vaunut.org railway photo gallery
 Route 

Former railway lines in Finland
900 mm gauge railways in Finland
Utajärvi
Railway lines opened in 1986
Railway lines closed in the 2020s
Tourist attractions in North Ostrobothnia